is a Japanese television drama broadcast on the TV Tokyo network on Fridays. It is in its third season. Jyouou is based on the manga Jyouou Virgin by Kurashina Ryō (倉科遼), adapted for the screen by Kajiki Minako (梶木美奈子). The show is produced by Okabe Shinji (岡部紳二), Morita Noboru (森田昇), Abe Shinji (阿部真士), Takahashi Kazuhiko (高橋萬彦) and Iwata Kazuyuki (岩田和行). Directors include Iwata Kazuyuki, Oyamada Masakazu (小山田雅和), Ueda Yasushi (植田泰史), Nemoto Kazumasa (根本和政), and Morita Noboru. The music was composed by Yuki Hayashi.

Season 1
Season 1 was broadcast between 2005-Oct-07 and 2005-Dec-23, consisting of 12 episodes. The opening theme was "What's Up" by Koto and the ending theme was "Perpetual Snow" by Vo Vo Tau.

Synopsis
Fujisaki Aya is a young college student whose family is 150 million yen in debt after her father's corporation went bankrupt. To earn the money, she enters the Hostess Grand Prix.

Cast
Hiromi Kitagawa as Fujisaki Aya
Noboru Kaneko as Nishizaki Tatsuya
Nana Ogawa as Shizuka (20)
Sora Aoi as Nikaido Arisa (23)
Akiho Yoshizawa as Mochizuki Meg
Momo Iizawa as Kisaragi Reika
Kana Kobayashi (小林加奈) as Ran
Komyo as Erika
Aika Suzuki as Midori
Miki Asaoka as Tachibana Maho
Takeo Nakahara as Nakabo Seiji
Satoko Ohshima as Fujisaki Mitsuko
Yu Numazaki (沼崎悠) as Fujisaki Kosuke
Yusuke Kamiji as Kuroda

Season 2
Season 2 (AKA Jyouou Virgin) was broadcast between 2009-Oct-02 and 2009-Dec-18. The opening theme was "Kimi ga Ite" by May J. and the ending theme was "with..." by Sweet Black feat. Maki Goto

Synopsis
Ando Mai is a young girl with a "complex". A learned habit from bullying in school over her "large breasts", Mai often "escapes" from troubling situations, and ends up being mistreated. To become a stronger person, she enters the "Hostess Grand Prix" competition.

Cast
Mikie Hara as Ando Mai
Akira Nagata as Amamiya Junichi
Reon Kadena as Kirishima Kaori
Saori Hara (原紗央莉) as Izumi Yuika
Natsuko Tatsumi as Mizuki Sara
Akari Asahina (朝日奈あかり) as Kanzaki Erina
Rin Sakuragi (桜木凛) as Haruna Miu
Aya Kiguchi as Aoyama Shuri
Miyuki Yokoyama as Sasaki Shoko
Atsushi (敦士) as Fukuda
Shiriyoshi Tsumura (津村知与支) as Manager Kato
Yuma Asami as Ichijo Ami
Hiroshi Okouchi (大河内浩) as Kirishima Shoichiro
Mei Kurokawa as Kinoshita Tomo
Kengo Ohkuchi (大口兼悟) as Sakuragi Takashi

Season 3

Cast
Mikie Hara as Ando Mai
Akira Nagata as Amamiya Junichi
Reon Kadena as Kirishima Kaori
Saori Hara (原紗央莉) as Izumi Yuika
Mei Kurokawa as Kinoshita Tomo

References

Japanese drama television series
Japanese television dramas based on manga
2005 Japanese television series debuts
2010 Japanese television series endings
TV Tokyo original programming